The Winter Olympic Games are a quadrennial international winter sports competition.

Winter Olympics may also refer to:
 "Winter Olympics" (The Goodies),  1973 episode of television series The Goodies  
 Winter Olympics (video game),  1994 video game